The Canada Health and Social Transfer (CHST) was a system of block transfer payments from the Canadian government to provincial governments to pay for health care, post-secondary education and welfare, in place from the 1996–97 fiscal year until the 2004–05 fiscal year. It was split into the Canada Health Transfer (CHT) and Canada Social Transfer (CST) effective April 1, 2004, to provide greater accountability and transparency for federal health funding.

Background
The CHST was announced in the 1995 Canadian federal budget as an amalgamation of two federal programs prior to 1996: 
 The Established Programs Financing program, which paid for health care and post-secondary education and was established in 1977 ;
 And the Canada Assistance Plan, which supported social assistance and was established in 1966.

Under the Constitution of Canada, health, education and social assistance are all areas of provincial responsibility and authority. The federal government does not directly participate in the administration of government services in these areas, though federal money through the CHST and its successors is used to fund them. But unlike equalization payments, which provinces can spend on anything, money distributed through the CHST is conditional and must be spent on health, post-secondary education or welfare. Legislation such as the Canada Health Act specify standards that the provinces must maintain in order to receive funding.

The CHST and its successors consist of both cash transfers and tax transfers. Cash transfers are direct transfers of money from the federal government to the provinces. Tax transfers work because both federal and provincial governments collect personal and corporate income tax. A tax transfer involves the federal government reducing its income tax rates, leaving the provinces room ("tax points") by which they can increase their own taxes (and thus their revenues) without increasing the total tax burden on their citizens.

Criticism
The amount of transfer payments from the federal to the provincial governments is always controversial, particularly in the area of health care, which is of particular importance to Canadians. The premiers of Canadian provinces allege that federal funding has decreased markedly since the beginning of publicly funded health care, from fifty to sixteen cents of every dollar. The federal government denies this, saying that the provincial numbers ignore tax transfers and that federal funding never amounted to 50% of the cost of health care. The complexity of the funding formula means that each position depends on one's perspective.

Critics of the CHST, CHT and CST note that the programs have allowed the federal government to interfere in areas of provincial jurisdiction by giving Ottawa a powerful hammer (the threat of withdrawing the transfers to any province that displeases the federal government). With the possible exception of Alberta, any province which lost the CHT and CST would quickly face the collapse of its health care system, fiscal impoverishment or perhaps both.

Penalties for violation of conditions for receiving the health and social transfers have so far been restricted to cash deductions, as opposed to what would likely be a far more controversial penalty of actually attempting to charge differential federal tax rates in the offending province.

See also
Canada Health Act
Canada Health Transfer
Indian Health Transfer Policy (Canada)
Health care in Canada
Canadian Institute for Health Information
Canadian and American health care systems compared
Medicare (Canada)

External links
 Department of Finance (Canada): Federal Transfers to the Provinces and Territories
 Council of the Federation

Healthcare in Canada
Welfare in Canada
Higher education in Canada
Government finances in Canada